Oregon Park is a park located in northeast Portland, Oregon, in the United States. It is maintained by Portland Parks & Recreation.

Amenities 
Includes accessible picnic area, accessible play area, accessible restroom, basketball court, paths – paved, picnic tables, and playground.

Accessibility Information

Parking 

 Street parking
 1 designated parking space (not next to pathway)
 Paved pathway to play area with slight slope
 100 feet to play area

Play Area 

 Engineered mulch surface 
 Ramp into play area 
 Sensory play elements

See also

 List of parks in Portland, Oregon

References

External links
 

1940 establishments in Oregon
Kerns, Portland, Oregon
Northeast Portland, Oregon
Parks in Portland, Oregon
Protected areas established in 1940